Leavenworthia uniflora, called Michaux's gladecress or one-flowered gladecress, is a plant species native to the southeastern and Midwestern parts of the United States. It is reported from northwestern Georgia, northern Alabama, Tennessee, northern Arkansas, southern Missouri, Kentucky, southeastern Indiana and southwestern Ohio. It grows in open, sun-lit locations at elevations less than 500 meters (1700 feet).

Leavenworthia uniflora is an herb up to 20 cm (8 inches) tall. Basal leaves are up to 13 cm (5.2 inches) long, pinnately lobed with 3-10 pairs of lobes. Flowers are solitary, white, up to 6 mm across. Fruits are narrowly oblong, up to 3 cm (1.2 inches) long.

References

External links
photo of herbarium specimen at Missouri Botanical Garden, collected in Missouri in 2012
photo by Gerrit Davidse showing Leavenworthia uniflora in flower

uniflora
Flora of the Eastern United States
Plants described in 1803
Taxa named by André Michaux